This is a list of notable buildings of the Ancient Order of Hibernians, which are either meeting places or buildings that are otherwise significant in Hibernian history.

There are many Hibernian-associated buildings. This list is only those that are significant architecturally or otherwise, including those that have been documented in the National Register of Historic Places or a similar registry.

in Australia

Storey Hall, Melbourne

in the United Kingdom

Ballinderry Hibernian Hall, Ballinderry, Northern Ireland
Rosnashane AOH Hall, Rosnashane, Northern Ireland

in the United States

References

External links